Elana Mann (born November 26, 1982) is a contemporary artist who lives and works in Los Angeles, California.

Life
Mann received her B.F.A. from Washington University in St. Louis and her M.F.A from California Institute of the Arts, Valencia, CA. Currently, she is a Visiting Lecturer at Scripps College and Pitzer College. Mann is Jewish, and was raised in a family that was part of the Reconstructionist Judaism movement.

Work
At its root, Mann’s multidisciplinary artwork explores the possibility for one to rebel in contemporary society. Mann often utilizes a multidisciplinary approach to making art which has included performance, photography, event coordination, drawing, video, rioting, publishing, and sculpture. Many of her installations encourage public engagement and participatory performance among her audiences.

To make the video "Can't Afford the Freeway" (2007-2010), Mann recorded interviews with Captain Dylan Alexander Mack, an Iraq war veteran. These interviews would become the audio for a video where Mann recorded herself in several acrobatic and at times combative movements with her car.

In 2011, "Ass on the Street", a video in which the artist feels her way along a South Central fence in a black dress and donkey head she can't see out of was played on LA Metro Busses as part of Out the Window, a project initiative by the LA art production organization Freewaves.

in 2013 the artist created 3 large sculptures for an exhibition at Side Street Projects in Pasadena. Mann was inspired by listening technology used between World War I and World War II. Listening as a political act has been a consistent theme in Mann's work, and the following year she staged several conversations with civic and federal workers at Grand Park Los Angeles as part of a series of programing curated by Machine Project.

In November 2016, Mann installed a public mural at Baik Art in Los Angeles called "Talk Through the Hand." The mural corresponded with her solo show at Commonwealth and Council, called "The Assonant Armory."

Collaborative and collective projects

Exchange Rate 2008
Exchange rate: 2008, was organized by Elana Mann in response to the 2008 U.S. presidential election. Thirty-eight artists living in sixteen countries participated in the project. With the aid of the website exchangerate2008.com, participating artists produced, exchanged, and interpreted performance directions related to the election campaign. A book was published that documented the project.

ARLA
ARLA was formed by Mann, vocal artist Juliana Snapper, filmmaker Vera Brunner-Sung, and choreographer Kristen Smiarowski. ARLA is a flexiable acronym for Audile Receptives Los Angeles or A Ripe Little Archive. The group came together to study scores and techniques of listening developed by composer Pauline Oliveros. ARLA led workshops, listening sessions, discussion groups and did several performances most notably at Occupy LA and the Getty Museum. ARLA also published the People's Microphony Song Book, a book of performance scores that utilize the Peoples Microphone. When asked about how she felt about her scores being re-performed Pauline Oliveros said "I am happy that Elana Mann chose to use my Sonic Meditations for the People’s Microphony project. These pieces are meant for anyone that wants to perform them regardless of musical training.”

Chann & Mann
Since 2005, Elana Mann and Audrey Chann, have collaborated under the moniker Chann & Mann. The duo formed during their studies at the California Institute of the Arts. They had their first retrospective "Chann & Mhann: A Historical Retrospective" at Elephant Art Space. Chan & Mann reperformed Leslie Labowitz-Starus Myths of Rape at the 2012 LA Art Show. Chan & Mann organized Shares & Stakeholders: The Feminist Art Project Day of Panels at the 2012 College Art Association Conference at the Museum of Contemporary Art. In 2013 Chan and Mann had a solo exhibition at the Ben Maltz Gallery at the Otis College of Art and Design called The glass ceiling is a glass hyman pierced by a glass dildo inside a larger glass vagina.

Chats About Change
"Chats About Change: Critical Conversations on Art and Politics in Los Angeles” was a two-day event organized by artists Elana Mann and Robby Herbst. The program was hosted by Los Angeles Contemporary Exhibitions and the student union at Cal State L.A. A series of discussions amongst artist and activists, it included panels such as "navigating L.A.’s landscapes in ecologically conscious ways", “How Can I Participate?” and “Creative Dissonance,”.

Projects

Listening as a Movement (2013)
Searching for a signal(2013)
All ears, first edition(2014)
Villa Murmurs(2014)
Grand Rounds(2014)
The Assonant Armory(2016)
Year of Wonders(2020)
Sounds from the Swamp(2020)
Unidentified Bright Objects(2020)
Years of Wonders, Redux (2021)

Solo and 2 person Projects

2021
Year of Wonders, redux, 18th Street Arts Center, Santa Monica, CA
2020
Year of Wonders, Artpace, San Antonio, TX
Sounds from the Swamp, Lawndale Art Center, Houston, TX 
2018
Instruments of accountability, Pitzer College Art Galleries, Claremont, CA 
2016
The Assonant Armory, Commonwealth & Council, Los Angeles, CA
2014
Drone Duet, a collaboration with Matias Viegener, Digital Mural Project at the Culver Center of the Arts, UCR ARTSblock, Riverside, CA
2013
3 Solo Projects: Audrey Chan, Elana Mann, and Chan & Mann, Ben Maltz Gallery, Otis College of Art and Design, Los Angeles, CA
Listening as (a) movement, sculptural installation, series of events, and community organizing, Side Street Projects, Pasadena, CA
Meet the Chans and Manns, 323 Projects, Los Angeles, CA (Chan & Mann)
2012
Chann & Mhann: A Historical Retrospective, 2005-2012, Elephant, Los Angeles, CA (Chan & Mann)
2011
For more than one voice, 323 Projects, Los Angeles, CA
Die Gedanken Sind Frei (Our Thoughts Are Free), Jancar Gallery project space, Los Angeles, CA

Self-published books
 Conversation Pieces (2006)
 GIVE IT TO ME, DO IT TO ME, MAKE ME... (2007)
 Exchange Rate: 2008 (2009)
 Can't Afford the Freeway: A reader (2010)
 We Are the Art (2010)
 The People's Microphony Songbook (2012)

Grants and notable exhibitions
Elana Mann has been the recipient of numerous awards including:
 the California Community Foundation’s 2009 Visual Arts Fellowship 
 a 2012 and 2013 ARC grant from CCI.

2021
Sustainable Arts Foundation Award
Future Art Award
2020
International Artist-in-Residence, Artpace San Antonio
City of Los Angeles (COLA) Individual Artist Fellowship
2019
The Stone & DeGuire Contemporary Art Award
Artist-in-Residence at the Los Angeles Clean-Tech Incubator (AIR LACI)
2017-18
Ceramics Artist-In-Resident, Pitzer College
Cultural Trailblazer, City of Los Angeles, Department of Cultural Affairs
2017
Foundation for Contemporary Arts Emergency Grant
2015
Artist Community Engagement (ACE) Grant, Rema Hort Mann Foundation
2013
Artist in Residence, Amy Marie Sears Memorial Visiting Artist Series, St. Catherine University, St. Paul, MN
Durfee Foundation Artist's Resource for Completion (ARC) Grant (for Chan & Mann)
2012
Durfee Foundation Artist's Resource for Completion (ARC) Grant 
2010
Philadelphia Art Hotel residency, Philadelphia, PA
2009
California Community Foundation Visual Artist Fellowship for Emerging Artists
Kitty Chester Series of Curator’s Laboratory Projects, Fellows of Contemporary Art, Los Angeles, CA
<https://elanamann.com/about>

Her work is in several public and private collections including the Getty Research Institute. She has presented her work in city parks, buses, museums, empty lots, and galleries internationally, including:
 REDCAT, Los Angeles; 
 The Ford Foundation, New York; 
 A Gentil Carioca, Rio de Janeiro; 
 The Getty Villa, Los Angeles 
 and the Luxun Academy of Fine Arts, Shenyang, China.

References

External links
Official website

1982 births
Living people
Performance art in Los Angeles
American installation artists
Washington University in St. Louis alumni
California Institute of the Arts alumni
American Reconstructionist Jews